New York University's Fales Library and Special Collections is located on the third floor of the Elmer Holmes Bobst Library at 70 Washington Square South between LaGuardia Place and the Schwartz Plaza, in the Greenwich Village neighborhood of Manhattan, New York City. It contains the Fales Collection of rare books and manuscripts in English and American literature, the Downtown Collection, the Food and Cookery Collection, and the general Special Collections from the NYU Libraries.

The Tracey-Barry Gallery offers public exhibits of materials from the Library's collections.

The Fales Collection was given to NYU in 1957 by DeCoursey Fales in memory of his father, Haliburton Fales. It is especially strong in English literature from the middle of the 18th century to the present, documenting developments in the novel. Other related collections held in Fales include the Berol Collection of Lewis Carroll Materials, the Robert Frost Library, the Nelson F. Adkins collection of American Literature, and the manuscript collections of Elizabeth Robins, Peter Straub, E. L. Doctorow and Erich Maria Remarque.

The Downtown Collection documents the downtown New York city art, performance, film, and literary landscape from 1975 to the present. In addition to thousands of published books and magazines, the Downtown Collection includes extensive holdings of archival and manuscript material; film and video; original artwork; theatrical models; and other realia. Archival holdings range from the personal papers of writers such as Dennis Cooper, Richard Foreman and Lynne Tillman to the papers of publishing ventures such as High Risk Books and Between C & D to the archives of organizations such as Creative Time and Mabou Mines and the Gonightclubbing Archive of late 1970s punk rock video, photos, interviews and ephemera.

An area of recent growth in Fales is the Food and Cookery Collection of well over 15,000 books. The personal libraries of James Beard, Cecily Brownstone, and Dalia Carmel form the core of this collection which continues to expand.

The Fales Library preserves manuscripts and original editions of books that are rare or important not only because of their texts, but also because of their value as artifacts.

The Fales Library holds the personal papers and/or archives of the following, among others:
John Canemaker
Jerome Charyn
Dennis Cooper
E. L. Doctorow
Richard Foreman
Robert Hammond
April Palmieri
Elizabeth Robins
Peter Straub
Lynne Tillman
David Wojnarowicz
Kathleen Hanna
Sarah Jacobson
Pat Ivers
Emily Armstrong

External links 
 Fales Library Homepage and Finding Aids 
 BobCat online catalog

Literary archives in the United States
New York University
University and college academic libraries in the United States
Rare book libraries in the United States
Special collections libraries in the United States